Qiaokou is a town of Wangcheng district, Changsha, China. It is located on the western bank of Xiang river. The town is bordered by Lingbei town of Xiangyin to the north, Oujiangcha town of Heshan, Yiyang to the northwest, Jinggang Town to the west and south, Zhangshu town of Xiangyin and Chating town across the Xiang river to the east.

Subdivision
On March 23, 2016, the village-level divisions of Qiaokou were adjusted from 11 to 8, Qiaokou residential community reformed by merging Qiaokou residential community and Heyehu village, Tianxinping village reformed by merging tianxinping and Shuixing villages, Lantangsi village reformed by merging Lantangsi and Xianyutang villages. There seven villages and one 
residential community.

References

Township-level divisions of Wangcheng
Wangcheng